Heraldic visitations were tours of inspection undertaken by Kings of Arms (or alternatively by heralds, or junior officers of arms, acting as their deputies) throughout England, Wales and Ireland. Their purpose was to register and regulate the coats of arms of nobility, gentry and boroughs, and to record pedigrees. They took place from 1530 to 1688, and their records (akin to an upper class census) provide important source material for historians and genealogists.

Visitations in England

Process of visitations

By the fifteenth century, the use and abuse of coats of arms was becoming widespread in England. One of the duties conferred on William Bruges (or Brydges), the first Garter Principal King of Arms, was to survey and record the armorial bearings and pedigrees of those using coats of arms and correct irregularities. Officers of arms had made occasional tours of various parts of the kingdom to enquire about armorial matters during the fifteenth century.  However, it was not until the sixteenth century that the process began in earnest.

The first provincial visitations were carried out under warrant granted by Henry VIII to Thomas Benolt, Clarenceux King of Arms dated 6 April 1530. He was commissioned to travel throughout his province (i.e. south of the Trent) with authority to enter all homes and churches. Upon entering these premises, he was authorized to "put down or otherwise deface at his discretion... those arms unlawfully used". He was also required to enquire into all those using the titles of knight, esquire, or gentleman and decided if they were being lawfully used.

By this writ, Henry VIII also compelled the sheriffs and mayors of each county or city visited by the officers of arms to give aid and assistance in gathering the needed information. When a King of Arms, or Herald, visited a county, his presence was proclaimed by presenting the King's royal commission to the local gentry and nobility, which required them to provide evidence of their right to use a coat of arms. The Sheriff would collect from the bailiff of each hundred within his county a list of all people using titles or arms.

In the early days, the visiting herald would tour the homes of the gentry and nobility, but from the late 1560s these persons were summoned to attend a central "place of sitting" – usually an inn – at a particular time. They were to bring their arms, and proof of their right to use them, most often by way of detailing their ancestral right to them, which would also be recorded. Where an official grant of arms had been made, this was also recorded. Other ancient arms, many of which predated the establishment of the College of Arms, were confirmed. The officer would record the information clearly and make detailed notes that could be entered into the records of the College of Arms when the party returned to London.

An example of the text of a herald's Visitation writ is the following, issued by Edward Bysshe, then Clarenceux King of Arms, dated 1 July 1664 and addressed to the Constables of the Hundred of Clackclose in Norfolk, giving them notice of two and a half months to muster the local gentry in the Black Swan Inn at Downham Market at 8 am: 

The resulting volumes now make up the collection of Visitation Books at the College, which contain a wealth of information about all armigerous people from the period. If the officers of arms were not presented with sufficient proof of the right to use a coat of arms, they were also empowered to deface monuments which bore these arms and to force persons bearing such arms to sign a disclaimer that they would cease using them. The visitations were not always popular with members of the landed gentry, who were required to present proof of their gentility.

Following the accession of William III in 1689, no further commissions to carry out visitations were commanded. The reasons behind this cessation of the programme have been a matter of debate among historians. Philip Styles, for example, related it to a declining willingness of members of the gentry to attend visitations, which he traced to a growing proportion of "newly risen" families, who lacked long pedigrees and were therefore apathetic about registering them. However, Janet Verasano has challenged this interpretation, finding that (in Staffordshire, at least) gentry enthusiasm for coats of arms as an enhancement to social standing persisted to the end of the 17th century. The end of the visitations did not have much effect on those counties far removed from London, some of which had only been rarely visited over the entire period of the visitations.

There was never a systematic visitation of Wales. There were four visitations in the principality, and on 9 June 1551, Fulk ap Hywel, Lancaster Herald of Arms in Ordinary, was given a commission to visit all of Wales. This was not carried out, however, as he was degraded and executed for counterfeiting the seal of Clarenceux King of Arms. This is regrettable, since no visitation of all Wales was ever made by the officers of arms.

Records

The principal records to emerge from the visitations were pedigrees, initially recorded on loose sheets of paper, and afterwards bound together as notebooks. In some cases, the sheets would include blank shields which had been drawn in advance (or at a later date printed), to simplify the process of recording coats of arms. The persons whose pedigrees were recorded were required (from about 1570 onwards) to certify them by signature, and where these original draft pedigrees have survived they are known as "originals with signatures". The signed copies were taken back to the College of Arms, where fair copies were made to a higher standard and preserved as the "office copies". Sometimes the signed copies were also retained at the College, but in other cases, no longer considered of official interest, they might pass into private hands: once in general circulation, further copies were often made, which might in turn be revised or augmented. As a result of these processes of transmission, a number of variant manuscript copies of any one visitation record may now survive, possessing varying degrees of accuracy and authority. The Harleian Collection of the British Library is particularly rich in such records. Many visitation records have been published over the years, by the Harleian Society, by county record societies, and a few privately (see listing below). However, because until relatively recently the College of Arms restricted access to its records, many of the older published editions were necessarily based on the unofficial second- or third-generation copies in other collections, and may therefore not always be reliable.

From as early as the 1530s, officers of arms on visitation frequently also compiled what were known as "church notes". These were fieldnotes (usually in the form of sketches) of coats of arms observed on church monuments, in stained glass windows, or on display in private houses. Sometimes, drawings were also made of non-heraldic antiquities, such as medieval architectural features, views of towns, Roman inscriptions and even Stonehenge.

The 17th-century visitations generated a growing number of supplementary papers, including warrants, lists of persons who disclaimed any pretence to arms, lists of persons summoned to appear before the heralds (including those who had not appeared), records of fees paid, and miscellaneous correspondence.

Lists of visitations
Visitations were conducted by or in the name of the two provincial Kings of Arms, Clarenceux and Norroy, within their respective provinces. In the following lists, the Deputies are the officers of arms who actually carried out the visitations. Where no Deputy is named, the visitation can be assumed to have been conducted by the King of Arms in person.

Southern Province
The Southern Province, the jurisdiction of Clarenceux King of Arms, comprised that part of England south of the River Trent, i.e. the counties of Bedford, Berks, Buckingham, Cambridge, Cornwall, Devon, Dorset, Essex, Gloucester, Hereford, Hertford, Huntingdon, Kent, Leicester, Lincoln, Middlesex, Monmouth, Norfolk, Northampton, Oxford, Rutland, Salop, Somerset, Southampton, Suffolk, Surrey, Sussex, Warwick, Wilton, Worcester, and the City of London; and South Wales.

Northern Province
The Northern Province, the jurisdiction of Norroy King of Arms, comprised that part of England north of the River Trent, i.e. the counties of Chester, Cumberland, Derby, Durham, Lancaster, Northumberland, Nottingham, Stafford, Westmorland and York; and North Wales. The Trent ran through Staffordshire, and the county was therefore technically divided between the two provinces; but for the purposes of visitation it was generally treated (sometimes through a process of deputation) as falling under the jurisdiction of Norroy.

Visitations in Ireland

Since the practices of Ulster King of Arms so closely followed those of the English College of Arms, it is hardly surprising that the Irish officers of arms undertook heraldic visitations in their province. The purpose behind these visitations was twofold: to prevent the assumption of arms by unqualified people, and to record the arms of the gentry that were unknown to Ulster office. The first visitation was held by Nicholas Narbon, the second Ulster King of Arms, in 1569. He was authorized to reform practices which were contrary to good armorial practice. He conducted six visitations (Dublin in 1568–1573, Drogheda and Ardee in 1570, Dublin in 1572, Swords in 1572, Cork in 1574, and Limerick in 1574). One of his successors, Daniel Molyneux had the commission renewed, and mounted several visitations. Although Molyneux's last visitation – of Wexford – was the last proper visitation, two other expeditions occurred after 1618 by subsequent Ulster Kings of Arms. The visitations were not very extensive. The officers would not often be found in the disturbed countryside. Thus the visitations are confined to areas under firm control of the Dublin administration.

Today, the original visitation and related manuscripts are in the custody of the Chief Herald of Ireland. Copies are also deposited at the College of Arms in London.

Published editions

England
Bedfordshire

Berkshire

Buckinghamshire

Cambridgeshire

Cheshire

Cornwall
 (Index pp. 643–672 )

(see also: Cornish heraldry)

Cumberland

Derbyshire

Devon

 (see also: Devon heraldry)
Listing of Devonshire "Ignobile Omnes", deemed by William Camden, Clarenceux King of Arms in 1620 (through his 2 deputies) "all ignoble", unable to prove their pedigrees to satisfy the heralds that they were entitled to be called armigerous or gentleman. To be classed as "ignobiles" was to be publicly shamed. (Published in Worthy, Charles, (Principal Assistant to Somerset Herald in Ordinary), "Devonshire Wills", London, 1896, derived from MS.Harl.1080,fo.342)

Dorset

County Durham

Essex

Gloucestershire

Hampshire

Herefordshire

Hertfordshire

Huntingdonshire

Kent

Lancashire

Leicestershire

Lincolnshire

London

Middlesex

Norfolk
 (see archive.org text )

Northamptonshire

Northumberland

Nottinghamshire

Oxfordshire

Rutland

Shropshire

Somerset

Staffordshire
 

Suffolk

Archive.org text 

Archive.org text 

Surrey

Sussex

Warwickshire

Westmorland

Wiltshire

Worcestershire

Yorkshire

Wales

See also
College of Arms
Court of the Lord Lyon
King of Arms

Notes

Bibliography

 (contains lists and indexes of the manuscript copies and published editions of the visitations, and family names included within them)

 (contains texts of visitation patents of aid, commissions, appointments of deputies etc.)

External links
Heraldic Visitations of Cheshire
The Harleian Society
Notes from the visitation of William Fellows, Lancaster Herald, at Carmarthen in 1530: Jones, Francis, The Carmarthenshire Historian, vol. 20, (1985) 65-71.
Free Visitations online

Heraldry
Historical eras
British genealogy
Heraldry and law